Vexillum emiliae is a species of small sea snail, marine gastropod mollusk in the family Costellariidae, the ribbed miters.

Description
The length of the shell varies between 10 mm and 12.5 mm.

Distribution
This marine species occurs off Hawaii, the Tuamotus and the Philippines

References

 Turner H. (2001) Katalog der Familie Costellariidae Macdonald 1860 (Gastropoda: Prosobranchia: Muricoidea). Hackenheim: Conchbooks. 100 pp.

External links
 
 Pease, W. H. (1868 ("1867") ). Descriptions of marine Gasteropodæ, inhabiting Polynesia. American Journal of Conchology. 3(3): 211-222
 Bieler, R.; Petit, R. E. (2012). Molluscan taxa in the publications of the Museum Godeffroy of Hamburg, with a discussion of the Godeffroy Sales Catalogs (1864–1884), the Journal des Museum Godeffroy (1873–1910), and a history of the museum. Zootaxa. 3511: 1-80

emiliae
Gastropods described in 1874